Luigi Amat di San Filippo e Sorso (20 June 1796 – 30 March 1878) was the dean of the College of Cardinals during the last part of the record long reign of Pope Pius IX.

Biography
The issue of an ancient and noble Catalan Sardinian family, he was the fifth child and fourth son of Giovanni, Marquess of San Filippo, and Eusebia, Baroness of Sorso. He did his early education wholly in Sardinia, which was unusual for someone who was later to become a major curial official in those days, as most curial officials had to come from the Papal States. Between 1815 and 1825, he obtained distinction as a student of both civil and canon law, and became a priest in 1826. From that point on, he rose rapidly, becoming a bishop just one year after his ordination and soon after a nuncio to the Sicilian kingdom (then separate from mainland Italy), and later to Spain. He was expelled when the Papal States broke off diplomatic relations with Spain in 1835, but two years later Pope Gregory XVI elevated him to the rank of cardinal.

After his elevation to the cardinalate, Cardinal Amat continued his previous work as a papal legate in various parts of Italy until the late 1840s. He participated in the conclave that elected Pius IX and in 1852 opted for the order of cardinal bishops. He was Vice-Chancellor of the Holy Roman Church from later that year until he died. During most of Pius IX's reign Cardinal Amat held control of the police force in the Papal States: it has come to light that early in Pius's reign he sacked many policemen because of their political sympathies and was involved in many major political incidents as sympathy within the Papal States for a united Italy increased in the early 1860s. However, Cardinal Amat had considerable success whilst in Bologna in cooling sympathy for socialism in a city that was to become renowned for this in later years.

In 1876, at the age of eighty, Cardinal Amat became the longest-serving cardinal in the Church, and officiated over the conclave of 1878 that elected Pope Leo XIII. He was already in poor health by this time and as it turned out lived only one month longer than Pope Pius IX.

References

External links
 Biography

1796 births
1878 deaths
People from the Province of Cagliari
Deans of the College of Cardinals
Sardinian Roman Catholic priests
19th-century Italian cardinals
Cardinals created by Pope Gregory XVI
Cardinal-bishops of Ostia
Cardinal-bishops of Palestrina
Cardinal-bishops of Porto
Participants in the First Vatican Council
19th-century Italian Roman Catholic bishops